Saphenista cubana is a species of moth of the family Tortricidae. It is found on Cuba.

The wingspan is about 8–13 mm. The ground colour of the forewings is cream, with ochreous and pale ochreous-brown suffusions and brownish dots. The hindwings are whitish, tinged with brownish grey and pale basally.

Etymology
The species name refers to the name of the island where the type locality is located.

References

Moths described in 2007
Saphenista
Endemic fauna of Cuba